Theeran Adhyaayam Ondru or simply Theeran is a 2017 Indian Tamil-language action thriller film written and directed by H. Vinoth and produced by S. R. Prakashbabu and S. R. Prabhu under the banner Dream Warrior Pictures. Based on the incidents from the Operation Bawaria case, it depicts the nefarious activity of dacoits and its eventual containment with the Tamil Nadu Police squad headlined by DGP S. R. Jangid. The film stars Karthi, in the titular character Theeran, modelled on Jangid, alongside Rakul Preet Singh and Abhimanyu Singh, who plays the main antagonist.

Vinoth had planned for the script based on the incident even before his debut film Sathuranga Vettai (2014), but he later worked on the project in late-2014. To research further, he had met many police officers who handled the similar cases. Following an official announcement in December 2016, principal photography commenced in January 2017 and ended that July. Filming took place in many real locations across Chennai and North India, in order to capture the authenticity of the film and has been shot in locations where the incident happened. The film's cinematography was handled by Sathyan Sooryan and editing done by Sivanandeeswaran. Ghibran composed the soundtrack and film score.

The film, distributed and co-produced by Reliance Entertainment, released worldwide on 17 November 2017. The film opened to critical acclaim, praising the direction, writing, cinematography, soundtrack, musical score and the cast performances—especially that of Karthi. The authenticity of capturing the incidents, along with the realistic portrayal of Tamil Nadu Police in fiction was highlighted and praised by critics. As per source it was a box-office success, grossing 96 crore In addition, the film won an Ananda Vikatan Cinema Awards and Techofes awards, two Edison and Vijay awards each. It received three nominations at the South Indian International Movie Awards and five Filmfare Awards; the film's only win was Best Tamil Actor (Critics) for Karthi. Film Companion ranked the film as one of the '25 Greatest Tamil Films of the Decade' and Karthi's performance among '100 Greatest Performances of the Decade'.

Plot 
Sasi, who is the cop in charge, orders that the documented criminal cases in the form of manuscripts be converted into digital format. During this process, he comes across a really spine-chilling dacoity murder case from several years ago. After reading the case history, he calls up the police officer who had taken charge of the case, Theeran Thirumaran.

1995: Theeran is in his police training college, who is undergoing training to be posted as DSP from T.N.P.S.C exams. Theeran tops the training period and returns to his hometown of Tanjavur, where he falls in love with his new neighbor Sripriya alias Priya, and the two happily get married. Simultaneously, a group of dacoits wrecks a house, situated along the highway of Tamil Nadu, where they barge and kill all the people inside gruesomely and takes their belongings. Later, Theeran becomes known in the police department for his ways of handling various cases, and is later moved to Ponneri after a dacoital attack. Police Inspector Satya and Theeran both handle the case but lead nowhere with the case. 

2003: Theeran, Sathya, and a group of other cops go around India to see if they are able to identify the fingerprints of the dacoits. During this process, Theeran learns that these dacoits are actually tribe members of the left over cultural groups after the Indian Independence. They are eventually stopped by the carelessness of their superior officers, and the case is put on hold. Later, the dacoits raid the house of the ruling party's MLA and kill him. The government is under heavy pressure from the public, and the Home Minister gives Theeran all powers and a full team to nab the dacoits. 

2004: Theeran and his team find one fingerprint match in Uttar Pradesh prison and go to a lorry station to capture the dacoit. Learning that the lorry has left and it is heading to Ponneri, Theeran and the other officers rush to stop them. The dacoits raid Sathya's house where they kill his wife, but Sathya's daughter is saved and Priya is put in a coma. Angered by this incident, Theeran, with the help of higher officials, puts together a team to capture the gang of dacoits leads by Oma. They camp in Rajasthan with the help of a local police officer. They also learn that the gang members except Oma are in their village, so they visit the village, only to be sent out by the villagers. 

While the case is going on, Theeran learns that Priya has died, which fuels his anger, and her death makes him even more motivated to find Oma. The team learns that there is a way to bring Oma out from his village. Theeran captures the organizer of the gang and one of the gang members and puts them in police custody. Infuriated, Oma vows to kill Theeran and his team. Theeran receives information that Oma will be on a train which is infiltrated by the team. Oma's right-hand man Khali manages to beat the cops that attempt to capture Oma. Theeran manages to arrive, but Oma pulls the chain and he, Khali, and friend Bhora escapes. A local shepherd offers Theeran and his team a stay at his village. 

Theeran and his team walk to the village and reside there for the night. Oma's gang infiltrates the village using the hunting tactics of wolves. Theeran formulates a plan and manages to kill all of them except Oma and Khali. Oma sets the village on fire and escapes with Khali. However, on their way out, Theeran shoots Khali dead. Theeran chases Oma the whole night and catches up with him. After a prolonged fight Theeran knocks out Oma and drags him back to Tamil Nadu to be sentenced.

2017: It is revealed that Theeran has a boring, useless post in the Traffic vigilance department because he is straightforward and lives alone. Theeran is visited by Sathya, Sathya's daughter, and Sasi, who being impressed by his work and history, salutes him in glory.

Cast 

 Karthi as Deputy Superintendent of Police Theeran Thirumaran, an honest and straightforward cop assigned to take charge of handling the dacoity murder case and also to punish the convicts.
 Rakul Preet Singh as Sripriya "Priya" Theeran (Periya Lion), Theeran's love interest and wife
 Abhimanyu Singh as Omveer Singh (Oma the fiend), the leader of the dacoity gang and also the main convict in the case
 Bose Venkat as Inspector Sathya
 Praveena as Theeran's mother
 Manobala as Priya's father
 Kalyani Natarajan as Priya's mother
 Sathyan as Theeran's friend
 Sonia as Sathya's wife
 Pradeep Rayan as Constable Sasi
 R. N. R. Manohar as Minister
 Abhirami as Theeran's sister
 Kishor Kadam as Haram Singh
 Mathew Varghese as IGP Vijay Rathore
 Vignesh Vijayan as Vicky, Special Team officer
 Rohit Pathak as Bane Singh
 Narra Srinivas as Madhur
 Surender Thakur as Kaali
 Prayas Mann as Bohra
 Jameel Khan as Pandit
 Scarlett Mellish Wilson as item number "Tinga Tinga"

Production

Development 
Following the success of his first film Sathuranga Vettai (2014), director H. Vinoth was keen to make a sequel to the film starring either Suriya or Ajith Kumar, but their reluctance meant that he moved on to work on a different project based on the Operation Bawaria case. He stated that he had the idea of making a film on the case before he made Sathuranga Vettai but had forgotten about it until he opened a food parcel, which was coincidentally covered with a newspaper article narrating the events of the operation and the incident subsequently inspired him to work on the script. Initially, planned as a road-trip film, the script was later evolved into a full-fledged police story revolving around the entire timelines of the operation and the events happened. As a part of his research, Vinoth met a top-rung police officer with the help of his close friend, as a part of his research and had met nearly hundred officials who handled similar cases.

In February 2016, he approached Karthi to play the lead role in the police drama film and was insistent that the final version carried the same "social responsibility angle" that the initial script had carried. Karthi expressed his immediate interest in working on the film, and recalled that he had first heard about the case while he was working on the making of Siruthai (2011). Vinoth continued to script the film throughout the year, while Karthi finished his pending work for Kaashmora (2016) and Mani Ratnam's Kaatru Veliyidai (2017). The film was officially titled as Theeran Adhigaaram Ondru in December 2016, with S. R. Prabhu's Dream Warrior Pictures agreed to produce the film in co-production with Reliance Entertainment which had distributed the film.

Speaking about the scaling and production of the film, H. Vinoth said that "it is a bigger film than Sathuranga Vettai. That film, was just 10% of the original vision he had executed and planned to construct the six chapters of the film, with each chapter set within a specific geography, a dialect and a colour tone, which he had given up due to budget constraints". In this film, he had planned to shoot in original locations instead of cheating terrains in Chennai where they experience all that characters go through. Vinoth said that the producer gave full freedom on the filming without having thoughts on the film's budget.

Casting 

Karthi plays the titular character Theeran, modelled on the Tamil Nadu Director General of Police S. R. Jangid, who led a special team to track down the main criminals involved in dacoity as a part of the Operation Bawaria case. Interestingly, while compared to his brother, Suriya's character Durai Singam in the Singam franchise, Karthi said that "he has a command over things and he can reprimand anyone he wants", but referred the titular role as "an upright cop who goes about his work in a tactful manner" and is true to the original character despite tweaked. For Karthi's costumes in the film, the team actively chose to use organic cotton shirts after being recommended to by Karthi's mother, Lakshmi Sivakumar since he felt that "the products were cheap and made of good-quality organic cotton, while also wanted to promote and encourage the product, starting it from our own production". To prepare for his role, Karthi underwent police training at the YMCA Campus in Chennai even before production began.

Rakul Preet Singh was signed to play the leading female role in the film. Talking about her character, Karthi said that "she has a nice and meaty role in it and would bring the much-needed relief in the film". Abhimanyu Singh was selected to portray the main antagonist Omveer Singh (Oma the fiend), based on the main culprit Om Bawaria involved in the operation Bawaria case. His character was considered to be a unique role in the film. Bose Venkat was also selected to portray a police officer in the film, with the actor stating that the role gave him "a new dimension and a new identity". Telugu actor Narra Srinivas made his debut in Tamil cinema by playing a police officer. Sathyan Sooryan was selected to handle the cinematography for the film, while Dhilip Subbarayan, Kathir, Sivanandeeswaran were signed to handle the stunt, art departments and editing respectively.

Filming 

In December 2016, a photo shoot for the film was held at Balu Mahendra Studios in Chennai with fashion photographer Venket Ram capturing the stills of Karthi's look in the film. The shooting of the film kickstarted on 17 January 2017, with major sequences being shot in Chennai, and the team later headed to North India for filming several sequences. In mid-February 2017, the team headed to Rajasthan for shooting action scenes and the schedule went on for 40 days. Later, another 40-day schedule was held in Bhuj in mid-March 2017. To make the film as authentic as possible, Vinoth actively hired artistes from the regions and insisted on shooting in such locations, rather than replicating the terrains in Chennai or in studios. As the film takes place for more than a decade beginning from the 1980s, Vinoth had to shoot at well-developed places, instead of constructing sets as Vinoth said that "the storyboard has nearly 150 sites and it is impossible to construct sets in many locations, as a result went on a location scouting for many places which took a long time".

Though the realistic approach was praised, the crew members working on the film faced difficulties while shooting in the project, where several of the film's cast and crew fell sick during the making of the project as a result of the warm climate. On filming a chase scene involving two buses on a highway in Bhuj, Karthi said that "the exposure to the harsh sunlight became unbearable that he was literally under the verge of developing sun stroke". While another sequence featuring Karthi riding a horse in a river bed was filmed at Rajasthan-Gujarat border, the female horse named Chandini ran for two kilometres without break before finally stopping due to exhaustion. Karthi said that "the horse was only used in enclosed spaces, so when, the film was shot in a wide area and exposed to such freedom, the horse just began to run". The team also encountered sandstorm while shooting for the film, where a crane toppled over and drone cameras got damaged; the locals asked the team to cover themselves with balnkets and patiently wait till the storm subsided. Karthi, in an interview, described it as one of his most extensive action films, remarking the action sequences were not easy to execute.

A huge set was erected in Rajasthan for few sequences in the film. In April 2017, an item number featuring actress Scarlett Mellish Wilson at Jaisalmer Fort in Rajasthan, with the song being choreographed by Brindha. In mid-June, the team returned to Chennai to shoot the final schedule of the film which took place for a month. As of late-June, the team had completed more than 95% of the sequences, and needed 3–4 days, to complete the entire shoot. With the patchwork scenes being completed, the team wrapped the shooting of the film by mid-July 2017.

Post-production 
Post-production of the film simultaneously began during the final schedule of the shoot. Karthi completed dubbing for the film at the same time. The animation sequence about the backstory of Bawaria was headlined by R. Senthil Kumar and S. Jayachandran of Hybrid Studio, a Chennai-based animation company. Vinoth consulted and hired the team after eventually working for Sathuranga Vettai (2014). He gave the script quite early, as it had scope for animation as it had a couple of portions that involved history. Jayachandran used the painting style for one portion and a graphic novel approach for the pre-interval sequence, with the primary use of colors — black, white and red — since blood was the theme of the film. The painting style that was the more complex one which had demanded more resources and concentration for the team.

The two-and-half minute sequence had 4,000 frames with each frame being painted individually. So the animation team hired ten students from Government College of Arts, and were taught to paint the frames digitally. The process completed within one-and-a-half months, as compared to manual painting that may take a long time. The animation and production of this sequence went on for six months. Speaking about the use of animation, Vinoth said that "the scenes might feel difficult in production as it required the historical approach and further more it featured excessive violence sequences, that may result in huge cuts when it comes to censors. So the use of animation was considered as the appropriate one."

Soundtrack 

The film score and seven-song soundtrack is composed by Ghibran in his maiden collaboration with Karthi and H. Vinoth. Lyricists Thamarai, Umadevi, Vivek, Raju Murugan, Ranjith, Udayakumar and Soundararajan penned each song in the album. Besides composing, Ghibran also co-wrote the track "Sevatha Pulla" with Ranjith, who led vocals for the track. In his maiden attempt as a lyricist, Ghibran wrote few dummy lines, based on his college band experience and later re-wrote the same track with the lines have been alternatively changed. The audio launch of the film was cancelled due to the heavy rains in Chennai and instead, a formal press meet was held on 2 November 2017 at Sathyam Cinemas in Chennai, with the cast and crew attending the event. The soundtrack consisted of varied genres had the aspects of a conventional Tamil film music. The melody tracks appeared in the film were used partially as montages due to the scope of the romantic angle in the film appeared as sub-plot. The item number "Tinga Tinga" was featured in full in the film has two versions: the original version by Namitha Babu, and the dual version sung by Padmalatha, featured Hindi lyrics.

Historical accuracy 
The film depicts Operation Bawaria, the investigation of a series of dacoity cases by the Tamil Nadu Police Department. The operation led to the gunning down of two members of a criminal gang belonging to the Bawariya tribe from Uttar Pradesh as well as further arrests in the 2000s. Armed dacoits had struck affluent houses along National Highways in Tamil Nadu, Karnataka and Andhra Pradesh in the late 1990s and early 2000s. The operation against the criminals was officially launched in January 2005 soon after the murder of AIADMK MLA Sudarsanam from Gummidipoondi. A special team led by the then Director General of Police S. R. Jangid, worked in coordination with the Uttar Pradesh Police and intelligence agencies to track down the wanted criminals — Oma Bawaria, Bsura Bawaria, and Vijay Bawaria among others. The teams worked for several weeks to put together information and camped in remote locations in Rajasthan, Haryana and Punjab before gunning down Bsura Bawaria and Vijay Bawaria. The other prime suspects, Oma Bawaria, and K. Lakshman, alias Ashok Bawaria, were then arrested and brought to Tamil Nadu, where they were convicted and awarded the death penalty by a special court. The film was made in close consultation with Jangid and the other officers involved in the operation. Post-release of the film, Jangid appreciated the team for their realistic portrayal of events and praised the director's research for the film.

Release 
In September 2017, the makers kickstarted the promotions by launching the dates of the teaser and trailer release, with the film's scheduled release date of 17 November 2017 was announced. As per the official announcement by the production team, the teaser of the film was released on 27 September 2017, coinciding the Dusshera weekend. The official trailer was launched on the eve of Diwali (17 October 2017). Reliance Entertainment purchased the worldwide distribution rights, whilst Aditya Music which had the film's music rights, gained acquisition for the rights of the film in Andhra Pradesh and Telangana regions. Except for Chennai, Trichy–Thanjavur and Madurai–Ramanathapuram territories, all the areas has been sold on Minimum guarantee (MG) basis, while the theatrical rights in these regions have been sold on distribution basis.

The film opened in more than 450 theatres worldwide, which is a biggest release of a Karthi-starrer till date. The pre-bookings of the film started on 15 November 2017. Sathyam Cinemas allocated the main screen for the opening day of the release. In United States, the premiere shows for the film were conducted on 16 November, a day before the Indian release. Atmus Entertainment acquired the theatrical rights in the country, with the film being screened at 160 theatres in 83 locations. Even before the theatrical release, Star Vijay and Amazon Prime Video acquired the satellite and digital rights of the film. The film was made available in Amazon Prime Video, a month after its theatrical release, while the film's television premiere took place on 14 January 2018, coinciding with Pongal.

Post-release, a section of communities expressed disappointment over the depiction of Bawariya community as a clan of criminals. The makers released a statement, in response to the issue, saying "The movie is only based on the robbery incidents happened in various states of India. The film has not portrayed any community in bad light. No community thrives only on murder and robbery." The producers  further stated that the controversial scene and the word used to describe the community will not be included in theatres, television broadcast and official online streaming portal.

Reception

Box-office 
The number of shows further increased to 340 from 20 November, after the positive word-of-mouth received. Within the first five days, the film netted  whilst, at the second weekend, the film earned  from 243 shows. Despite new releases in the second week, the film topped the first position in the Chennai box-office. The total collection in the territory in the first 10 days, was reported to be . At the end of its theatrical run, the emerged as the highest-grossing film of Karthi, earned . Its record was later broken by Kaithi (2019), which earned ₹100 crore.

Critical response 
The film opened to critical acclaim, with praise directed on Karthi's performance, and Vinoth's direction and writing, apart from the realistic portrayal of Tamil Nadu Police in fiction, the incidents and the major technical aspects of the film. On the review aggregator website, Rotten Tomatoes, the film holds an approval rating 80% based on 9 reviews with an average rating 7.3/10.

The Times of India gave the film 4 stars (out of 5) and wrote: "Vinoth’s detailing with help from an able crew that pitches in with some of their best work to elevate the film from being a stand cop thriller." Srinivasa Ramanujan of The Hindu stated it as "an engrossing cop film that keeps you glued to the screen every moment" and further wrote "There’s sincerity in the writing and research and honesty in the performances. There are many highlights in Theeran, some of which even makes us evaluate how cops are portrayed in films. We've seen many cop films before. But Theeran hits home hard." Haricharan Pudipeddi of Hindustan Times stated that "Theeran is a gripping, explosive action drama that works despite its lengthy running time and the tiresome romantic portion which can be overseen by the end of the film." Baradwaj Rangan of Film Companion South wrote "There are plenty of sharp, funny lines, and the highlights keep coming, like a superbly choreographed action stretch on a bus. For Vinoth, Theeran Adhigaaram Ondru is a vast improvement over Sathuranga Vettai, where one sensed a lot of entertaining writing and little else. Even if it falls short of the standards it sets for itself, the film gives us more than most action movies do."

Ashameera Aiyyappan of The Indian Express said that "the film delivers what it promises and packs quite a neat punch in most places" and gave three out of five stars. Anupama Subramanian of Deccan Chronicle stated that the film "stands out for its honest and riveting portrayal of cops in fiction". Poornima Murali of News18 called the film as "gripping" and assigned a score of 3.5 stars (out of 5). Writing for Firstpost, film critic and trade analyst Sreedhar Pillai stated that "The film is very different in tone and presentation. The makers authentically portray the functioning of police and how they investigate. They have also shown us the practical difficulties in arresting criminals who operate outside the state without much commercial glorification or melodrama. The only commercial compromise Vinoth has made is to have a romantic plot for the hero for the regular family moments, comedy and background songs."

A critic from Behindwoods praised the action sequences in the film, which comes as a stand-out apart from "the intense suspense drama and the pace". Sify rated the film three out of five saying "an important story gets turned into a compelling film". Calling it as "one of the best films of the year", Indiaglitz said that "If Vinoth's Sathuranga Vettai is one of the most authentic deconstruction of heist and deception crimes Theeran is the same for police procedure.  Like how he posts a salute to the true cops who cracked the crimes in real life he deserves one for his painstaking research, authentic narration and plain honest hard work". Rediff-based writer Ganesh Nadar, called the film as "riveting". Sowmya Rajendran of The News Minute said "Theeran is a cop film entirely from the perspective of law enforcers and that makes its politics troubling. Nevertheless, given that we've had a slew of films in this genre in recent times (including the now-getting-stale Singam series), its triumph lies in managing to pull off something fresh and original." Sudhir Srinivasan of The New Indian Express stated that "Theeran Adhigaram Ondru isn’t your usual Tamil cop film, but that sadly doesn’t stop it from being crippled by some usual issues. The love angle is wholly dispensable, regardless of what Theeran’s manipulative voice-over will make you believe, and also by the inclusion of disappointing elements like the outdated villain-item-number. Part of the love you feel for the film is also watered down by this inability to wrap up things efficiently. But, nevertheless, it is a solid cop-film."

Awards and nominations

Impact 
Theeran Adhigaaram Ondru received praise from actors and directors from the Tamil film fraternity, including Karthi's brother Suriya, who watched the film at a special screening in Chennai and praised the team for making "a bold film with an impactful and realistic approach". Director Shankar also praised the film saying it as "a terrific cop film". Vijay too appreciated Vinoth's film-making style and authenticity after watching the film at a special screening in Chennai. The Hindu, The Indian Express, The New Indian Express and Firstpost ranked the film as one among the 'Best Tamil Films of 2017'. It was listed as the "Top 10 Indian Film" at IMDb along with Vikram Vedha and Baahubali 2: The Conclusion. Karthi said in the film's success meet, saying that "it tried him to work on new genres". In late-2019, Film Companion ranked the film as one of the '25 Greatest Tamil Films of the Decade' and Karthi's performance among '100 Greatest Performances of the Decade'. Sreedhar Pillai of Firstpost, stated that Theeran Adhigaaram Ondru and Thani Oruvan (2015), click among the general audience due to the realistic approach and stays true to the portrayal of Tamil Nadu Police in fiction, apart from mainstream Tamil films.

Notes

References

External links 
Official website

Films set in 1999
2017 films
Action films based on actual events
Crime films based on actual events
Thriller films based on actual events
Films shot in Rajasthan
2010s Tamil-language films
Films set in 2002
Films set in 2003
Films set in 2005
2010s masala films
Indian Western (genre) films
Indian action thriller films
2017 action thriller films
2017 crime thriller films
2017 Western (genre) films
2017 crime action films
Indian crime action films
Films set in Tiruchirappalli
Films set in Chennai
Films shot in Chennai
Films about organised crime in India
Fictional portrayals of the Tamil Nadu Police
Fictional portrayals of the Andhra Pradesh Police
Fictional portrayals of the Maharashtra Police
Films set in Uttar Pradesh
Films set in Rajasthan
Films about the caste system in India
Splatter films
Films about outlaws
Reliance Entertainment films
Indian police films
Films set in Bihar
Films set in Jharkhand
Films set in Madhya Pradesh
Films set in 1995
Films set in Andhra Pradesh
Films set in Delhi
Films scored by Mohamaad Ghibran
Films set in Haryana
2010s police procedural films
Police detective films
Films directed by H. Vinoth